This is a complete bibliography of the written works of American fantasy author R. A. Salvatore.

Forgotten Realms

Corona

First Trilogy
The Demon Awakens (1997)
The Demon Spirit (1998)
The Demon Apostle (1999)

Bridge novel
Mortalis (2000)

Second Trilogy
Ascendance (2001)
Transcendence (2002)
Immortalis (2003)

Saga of the First King
The Highwayman (2004)
The Ancient (2008)
The Dame (2009)
The Bear (2010)

The Coven
Child of a Mad God (2018)
Reckoning of Fallen Gods (2019)
Song of the Risen God (2020)

Other series

The Spearwielder's Tale
The Woods Out Back (1993)
The Dragon's Dagger (1994)
Dragonslayer's Return (1995)

Chronicles of Ynis Aielle
 Echoes of the Fourth Magic (completed 1987, published 1990)
 The Witch's Daughter (1991)
 Bastion of Darkness (2000)

Crimson Shadow series
The Sword of Bedwyr (1995)
Luthien's Gamble (1996)
The Dragon King (1996)

Star Wars
Star Wars Episode II: Attack of the Clones (film novelization, 2002)

Star Wars: The New Jedi Order
Vector Prime (1999)

Other novels
Tarzan: The Epic Adventures

Short stories
"The First Notch" (in Dragon magazine #152, 1989)
"A Sparkle for Homer" (in Halflings, Hobbits, Warrows, and Weefolk, 1991)
"Dark Mirror" (in Realms of Valor, 1993)
"The Third Level" (in Realms of Infamy, 1994)
"Guenhwyvar" (in Realms of Magic, 1995)
"The Coach With Big Teeth" (in Otherwere, 1996 and Unfettered, 2013)
"Gods' Law" (in Tales of Tethedril, 1998)
"Mather's Blood" (in Dragon magazine #252, 1998)
"That Curious Sword" (in Realms of Shadow, 2002)
"Three Ships" (in Demons Wars: Trial By Fire Comic TP, 2003)
"Empty Joys" (in The Best of the Realms, 2003)
"The Dowry" (in The Highwayman, 2004)
"Wickless In the Nether" (in Realms of Dragons, 2004)
"Comrades at Odds" (in Realms of the Elves, 2006)
"If Ever They Happen Upon My Lair" (in Dragons: World Afire, 2006)
"Bones and Stones" (in Realms of War, 2008)
"Iruladoon" (in Realms of the Dead, 2010)
"Hugo Mann's Perfect Soul" (in The Guide to Writing Fantasy and Science Fiction: 6 Steps to Writing and Publishing Your Bestseller, 2010)
"To Legend He Goes" (in Legend of Drizzt Anthology, 2011)

Graphic novel adaptations
Homeland
Exile
Sojourn
The Crystal Shard
Streams of Silver
Trial by Fire (2001)
The Halfling's Gem
Eye for an Eye
Legacy
Starless Night (Incomplete, only 1 of 3 issues published)

Comics
Spooks (with co-authors Larry Hama and Ryan Schifrin, and art by Adam Archer, Devil's Due Publishing, 2008)
Dungeons & Dragons: The Legend of Drizzt: Neverwinter Tales (with art by Agustín Padilla, IDW Publishing, 2011)
 Dungeons & Dragons: The Legend of Drizzt: Cutter (with Geno Salvatore)

Other media
The Accursed Tower, A 2nd Edition AD&D Module
Demon Stone role-playing Game released on PS2, Xbox, and PC
In collaboration with Seven Swords, R A Salvatore created the bot chat responses for the computer game Quake 3 Arena
Kingdoms of Amalur: Reckoning role-playing Game released Xbox 360, PS3, and PC February 2012

References

Bibliographies by writer
Bibliographies of American writers
Fantasy bibliographies